Science of the Total Environment is a weekly international peer-reviewed scientific journal covering environmental science. It was established in 1972 and is published by Elsevier. The editors-in-chief are Damià Barceló (Consejo Superior de Investigaciones Científicas), Jay Gan (University of California, Riverside) and Philip Hopke (University of Rochester). According to the Journal Citation Reports, the journal has a 2021 impact factor of 10.753.

Controversies
The October 2020 article suggesting that amulets may prevent COVID-19 has been met with skepticism even among the listed coauthors. As of November 2020, the article was under "temporary removal". It was later withdrawn at the request of the authors.

References

External links

Environmental science journals
Publications established in 1972
Elsevier academic journals
English-language journals
Weekly journals